Robert Ludwell Yates Peyton (February 8, 1822 – September 3, 1863) was a Missouri attorney, politician and Confederate States Army officer who served as a Confederate States Senator from February 18, 1862, until his death in Alabama of malaria contracted while defending Vicksburg, Mississippi in 1863.

Early and family life
Robert Ludwell Yates Peyton was born in Loudoun County, Virginia to Townsend Dade Peyton (1774-1852) and his second wife, the former Sarah Yates (1800-1864). His grandfather Francis Peyton (who died before the boy's birth) had been a prominent planter and politician in Loudoun County, representing it in the House of Burgesses, all five Virginia revolutionary conventions and both houses of the Virginia General Assembly. The family owned slaves in Virginia, but reportedly freed them before 1840 when Townsend Dade moved his family to Oxford in Butler County, Ohio, where they lived first with a free Black woman and her two children, then retired with his wife and a 12 year old free mulatto servant.

Meanwhile, Robert Ludwell Yates Peyton studied both at Miami College in Ohio, and the University of Virginia. He never married.

Career
By 1850, the 23 year old Peyton was an attorney and he and a 35 year old Ohio-born attorney boarded with merchant Squire Allen in Cass County, Missouri (near modern Kansas City). A decade later, he was among the dozens of people boarding with landlord W.J. Taylor in Harrisonville, the Cass County seat. He may or may not have been the "Robert N. Patton" who owned an enslaved man and woman in Deepwater, about 40 miles away.

Missouri voters elected Peyton to the Missouri State Senate in 1858. He became one of Missouri's delegates to the Provisional Confederate Congress and afterwards won election to the Confederate States Senate.

On July 16, 1861, days after the victory of the Missouri State Guards commanded by Governor Claiborne F. Jackson over federal forces at the Battle of Carthage, Peyton organized a cavalry troop that became known as the 3rd Missouri cavalry, with Peyton as its colonel, but would resign that commission on December 13, 1861.  He joined the Confederate States Army and died in Bladon Springs, Alabama on September 3, 1863, after catching malaria while defending Vicksburg, Mississippi.

See also
List of Confederate States senators

Notes

1822 births
1863 deaths
19th-century American politicians
Confederate States Army officers
Confederate States of America senators
Deaths from malaria
Deputies and delegates to the Provisional Congress of the Confederate States
Infectious disease deaths in Alabama
Missouri state senators
Missouri lawyers
People from Loudoun County, Virginia
People of Missouri in the American Civil War
Confederate States of America military personnel killed in the American Civil War